Stones Green is a hamlet near the village of Wix and the town of Harwich, in the Tendring district, in the English county of Essex.

References 
 A-Z Essex, 2010 edition. p. 18.

Hamlets in Essex
Tendring